Paul Qui (born August 14, 1980) is a Texas-based Top Chef winner and James Beard award recipient. He operates restaurants East Side King (Austin), Thai Kun (Austin) and Pao (Miami).

In 2011, he won the ninth season of reality television cooking competition Top Chef. Qui is also a winner of the James Beard Award.

Biography 
Paul Qui was born in Manila, Philippines and moved to the United States as a child. He attended high school in Springfield, Virginia and completed his culinary training at Le Cordon Bleu in Austin, Texas. His initial forays into cooking professionally led to a job with Tyson Cole, chef/owner of Uchi and Uchiko restaurants in Austin. During his time in the kitchen, Cole became Qui's mentor, and Qui eventually worked his way up to become the chef de cuisine and executive chef at Uchiko.

Qui was one of 29 contestants who appeared on Top Chef Season 9 in 2011, which was filmed in locations around Texas. He won eight of the season's 16 elimination challenges and went on to win the entire season.  Tom Colicchio, the head judge of Top Chef, said that Qui was the most talented chef in the first 12 seasons of the show.

Following his win, he returned to Austin and opened his flagship restaurant, Qui, and a venture called East Side King, which showcases various Japanese-inspired dishes via food trucks with business partner Moto Utsunomiya. Another of Qui's restaurants, Thai Kun, was recognized by Bon Appétit magazine as one of the best restaurants in America in 2014. In 2016, Qui opened Pao by Paul Qui at Faena Hotel in Miami Beach, Florida. In 2018, his new Houston restaurant Aqui received a rare four-star review from the Houston Chronicle, but it closed at the end of the year amidst controversy.

In 2016, Qui was charged with assaulting his then-girlfriend while intoxicated, charges that were dropped in 2018.

Qui opened an Asian-fusion restaurant in Dallas called TacQui in May 2018, but it closed just six months later.

In March 2019, Qui announced the opening of a second location of East Side King in Denver, Colo. inside the food hall Avanti Food & Beverage. However within a days of the announcement, Avanti owners opted to cut ties with Qui amid continued controversy over his 2016 assault arrest.

Awards and accolades 
In addition to his win on Top Chef, Paul Qui also has earned the following awards:
 Chef of the Year by Esquire Magazine in 2014
 Best Chef, Southwest by the James Beard Foundation in 2012
 One of Food & Wine magazine's best new chefs of 2014
 Winner of the 2013 S. Pellegrino Cooking Cup Young Chef of the Year

References 

American chefs
American male chefs
Asian American chefs
People from Manila
People from Austin, Texas
Living people
1980 births
Top Chef winners
James Beard Foundation Award winners